The Ekareku River is a river of Guyana, a tributary of the Wenamu River.

The Ekereku is one of the major tributaries of the Cuyuni River. Gold mining by dredging along the banks is a major economic activity along the Ekereu and in the greater region.

Services of the area include a police outpost and airstrip.

Sakaika Falls is on the Ekereko.

See also
List of rivers of Guyana

References

External links 
Ekereku: Our Ancestral Land Video from the Amerindian Peoples Association

Bibliography 

 Rand McNally, The New International Atlas, 1993.

Rivers of Guyana